Liam O'Neill (born 1947) is an Irish former Gaelic footballer who played as a right wing-back at senior level for the Galway county team.

O'Neill joined the team during the late 1960s and was a regular member of the starting fifteen for almost a decade. During that time he won six Connacht medals and one All-Star award. He is a member of a unique set of Galway players who lost three All-Ireland finals in four years

O'Neill had a lengthy club career with St Grellan's.

He went on to manage the Mayo county football team in later years and his son Kevin played inter-county football for Mayo.

References

1947 births
Living people
All Stars Awards winners (football)
Connacht inter-provincial Gaelic footballers
Gaelic football backs
Gaelic football managers
Galway inter-county Gaelic footballers
People from Ballinasloe
St Grellan's Gaelic footballers